"Fight Fire with Fire" is a song by American band Kansas, written by John and Dino Elefante for the 1983 album Drastic Measures. Charting at No. 58 on the Billboard Hot 100, it became the twelfth Kansas single to chart on the Top 100. It was promoted with a music video starring Dan Shor, which was blown up to 35 mm film and displayed as a trailer in movie theaters.

The song was re-released on several compilation and live albums, including The Best of Kansas, The Ultimate Kansas, Sail On: The 30th Anniversary Collection, and the live CD/DVD combos Device, Voice, Drum and There's Know Place Like Home.

Chart performance

References

1983 singles
Kansas (band) songs
1983 songs